Santa Familia is a village located along the Belize River in Cayo District, Belize. According to the 2010 census, Santa Familia has a population of 1,598 people in 321 households.

References 

Populated places in Cayo District
Cayo North East